The Normand Dube Aerocruiser Plus (also called the Aerocruiser 180) is a four-seat Canadian amateur-built aircraft, designed by Normand Dube and produced by Aviation Normand Dube of Sainte-Anne-des-Plaines, Quebec. The aircraft is a development of the two-seat Norman Dube Aerocruiser.

Design and development
The Aerocruiser Plus features a "V" strut-braced high-wing, a four-seat enclosed cabin accessed by doors, fixed  conventional landing gear and a single engine in tractor configuration.

The aircraft can be fitted with floats, wheels or skis.

The aircraft is made with a welded 4130 steel tubing fuselage and a riveted 2024 aluminum wing. The engine used on the prototype is a  Lycoming O-360 four-stroke powerplant.

Operational history
Reviewers Roy Beisswenger and Marino Boric described the design in a 2015 review as "outback-friendly".

By March 2017, one example, the prototype had been registered with Transport Canada.

Specifications (Aerocruiser Plus)

References

External links

Aerocruiser Plus
1980s Canadian sport aircraft
1980s Canadian civil utility aircraft
Single-engined tractor aircraft
High-wing aircraft
Homebuilt aircraft